Paul Anthony Bastock (born 19 May 1970) is an English professional footballer who plays as a goalkeeper for Boston United, and also serves the club from the role of the assistant manager.

He holds the all-time record for the most competitive club appearances in world football, having played more than 1,286 times in league and cup competitions, primarily across the English lower leagues.

During his career, which began in 1988, Bastock has represented more than twenty clubs, including Cambridge United, Boston United, Rushden & Diamonds and St Albans City. Having played 679 games in all competitions for the club, Bastock was voted as Boston's 'all-time cult hero' by viewers of the BBC show Football Focus in April 2005. He also played once for the England National Game XI (England C) in an unofficial game against a Highland League selection.

Club career 
He started his career in the youth team at Coventry City in the eighties and was a member of their 1987 FA Youth Cup winning side that beat a Southampton youth side including Alan Shearer and Matt Le Tissier. He was released by Coventry and signed his first professional contract in 1988 with Cambridge United where he stayed for one season during which he also played once on loan for Bath City in October 1988, a 1–1 draw against VS Rugby. He then moved to Malaysia to play in the Malaysian Super League where he had a short spell, specifically six months, with Sabah FA. He then moved back to England, where he spent time on trial with Newcastle United and Leyton Orient, and played a single match for Cheltenham Town in the Gloucestershire Senior Cup in return for a pair of gloves, before signing for Fisher Athletic. After a season with Fisher, he transferred to Kettering Town in 1990 where he spent two years.

At Kettering, after a brief period on loan at Aylesbury United, he impressed and was snapped up by Boston United in 1992. His next 12 years with the Lincolnshire club were to prove the best of his footballing career. His first season with Boston was a disaster, with the club finishing bottom and being relegated from the Football Conference to the Northern Premier League. However, despite conceding 69 goals in 42 games, Bastock was still voted Player of the Season by supporters. He started to concede less goals the season after and Boston had a string of respectable league positions from 1993 to 1998 when they were moved to the Southern Premier League and their fortunes took an upturn. Bastock helped them to a second-place finish in the 1998–99 season and the team won the league and were promoted back to the Conference in 2000. He spent two seasons in the Conference before Boston were promoted to the Football League Third Division, Bastock missing just one game all season as Boston won the Conference. He won the Player of the Season award again in the 2002–03 season, ten years after last winning it. He remained first choice throughout the whole 2003–04 season; the highlight of which was saving a penalty from Yeovil's Gavin Williams to help his side to a 3–2 win. In the summer of 2004, Boston signed Nathan Abbey and Bastock was unable to regain his first-team place. Whilst playing for Boston, he also worked as a care assistant in a nursing home.

He was awarded a testimonial match for his great service to the club before leaving to join Scarborough in October 2004. However, he stayed with Scarborough for just one week, before leaving due to family and travelling issues.

He signed for Dagenham & Redbridge later the same month. He stayed there for two months, making just one appearance, before he was signed by then Conference South side St Albans City in November 2004. He played in 84 consecutive league games for St Albans between his debut match on 23 November 2004 against Hornchurch and 10 November 2006 before he received a suspension after being sent off in an FA Cup tie against Yeading. During the 2005–06 season he was named Supporters Player of the Year, having kept a club record seven consecutive home clean sheets and also equalled the record of six consecutive clean sheets home or away as St Albans win promotion to the Conference.

In 2006, Bastock took a position as part-time goalkeeping coach with Boston United, continuing to play for St Albans until May 2007 when he joined Rushden & Diamonds after St Alban's relegation from the Conference. However, he was released by Rushden in February 2008 and rejoined St Albans City the following month. Within six games of returning was named Conference South Player of the Month He played a crucial role in helping St Albans escape a further relegation and was named as the Supporters Club Player of the Year at the end of the season, only the second player to with the honour twice.

Bastock rejoined former club Boston United, in March 2011. He left the club at the end of the season.

After spending the 2012–13 season at Worksop Town, it was announced he would be rejoining St Albans City for a third time for the 2013–14 season.

After one season with St Albans City, Bastock joined Royston Town in the summer of 2014, linking up with ex-St Albans manager Steve Castle.

Bastock moved up a division to sign for St Neots Town in October 2014 where he would go on to play his 1,000th game in senior football. However, despite being a regular for St Neots Town, Bastock was released by the club along with Matt Spring in 2015.

Bastock then moved to league counterparts Dunstable Town in the summer of 2015.

In January 2016, Bastock moved to Stamford. Injury sidelined him for parts of his time at the Lincolnshire-based club, restricting him to 20 league appearances before he departed in the summer of 2017.

He joined Corby Town prior to the 2017–18 season, making his debut in a 5–1 win at home to Romulus on 12 August. He signed for Wisbech Town on dual registration terms on 21 September 2017. On 2 October 2017 he announced that his stay at Corby Town had ended. In March 2018, he returned to Kettering Town on dual registration.

Bastock announced his retirement from playing at the end of the 2017–18 season at the age of 48 and joined the coaching staff of Grantham Town but was called upon at short notice to come out of retirement for one final league game due to injury, playing in the Northern Premier League fixture away to Basford United on 27 August 2018. He was named as one of the substitutes for a further 11 games that season but was not called upon to play. On 18 October 2018, Bastock signed for Pinchbeck United, and some days later made an appearance with the club on a UCL League Cup game. On 1 November 2018, Bastock joined King's Lynn Town as assistant manager. Eighteen days later, he turned out for the team in their Norfolk Senior Cup tie against the University of East Anglia.

In March 2021, aged 50, Bastock was named as a substitute for an away fixture against Notts County in the National League. He appeared on the bench on subsequent other occasions, with the latest being on 25 May 2021.

Bastock left King's Lynn Town on 10 December 2021.

On 13 August 2022, Bastock returned to playing for a United Counties League Premier Division North match for Deeping Rangers.

On 4 October 2022, Bastock was an unused substitute for Boston United in the FA Cup tie against Basford United.

International career 
Bastock also played once for the England National Game XI (England C) in a game against a Highland League selection.

Managerial career 
On 1 November 2018, Bastock joined King's Lynn Town as assistant manager, and left the club on 10 December 2021.

On 23 January 2022, Bastock was announced as Kettering Town's new assistant manager, alongside Ian Culverhouse. He left the club, along with Culverhouse, on 15 May 2022.

In September 2022, Bastock returned to Boston United for the role of the assistant manager, once again to Ian Culverhouse.

Personal life 
Bastock's son Callum is also a footballer and a fellow goalkeeper. He played several first-team games at semi-professional level for Boston Town before moving on 22 February 2013 to Grimsby Town on a two-year scholarship deal.

Career statistics

Club

Honours 
Coventry City
 FA Youth Cup Winners: 1986–87

Boston United
 Southern Football League Premier Division Champions: 1999–2000
 Football Conference Champions: 2001–02

St Albans City
 Conference South Play-off Winners: 2005–06

See also 
 List of men's footballers with the most official appearances

References

External links 

Paul Bastock's Boston United stats

1970 births
Living people
Sportspeople from Leamington Spa
English footballers
Association football goalkeepers
Coventry City F.C. players
Cambridge United F.C. players
Cheltenham Town F.C. players
Bath City F.C. players
Fisher Athletic F.C. players
Sabah F.C. (Malaysia) players
Kettering Town F.C. players
Aylesbury United F.C. players
Boston United F.C. players
Scarborough F.C. players
Dagenham & Redbridge F.C. players
Rushden & Diamonds F.C. players
St Albans City F.C. players
Worksop Town F.C. players
Royston Town F.C. players
St Neots Town F.C. players
Dunstable Town F.C. players
Stamford A.F.C. players
English Football League players
National League (English football) players
Northern Premier League players
Southern Football League players
British expatriates in Malaysia
Expatriate footballers in Malaysia
English expatriate footballers
Corby Town F.C. players
Wisbech Town F.C. players
King's Lynn Town F.C. players
King's Lynn Town F.C. managers